Santa Rosa may refer to: 
The Santa Rosa dialect of the Guamo language
The Santa Rosa dialect of Island Chumash
or any of several other local language varieties.